Craig Harold Paquette (born March 28, 1969) is an American former professional baseball third baseman. He played in Major League Baseball (MLB) for the Oakland Athletics, Kansas City Royals, New York Mets, St. Louis Cardinals, and Detroit Tigers. In 2007, he played for the Camden Riversharks.

A native of Long Beach, California, Paquette attended Rancho Alamitos High School and then went on to play college baseball for Golden West College. In 1988, he played collegiate summer baseball with the Brewster Whitecaps of the Cape Cod Baseball League. He was selected by Oakland in the 8th round of the 1989 MLB Draft.

References

External links

1969 births
Living people
Baseball players at the 1999 Pan American Games
Baseball players from Long Beach, California
Brewster Whitecaps players
Camden Riversharks players
Detroit Tigers players
Golden West Rustlers baseball players
Huntsville Stars players
Kansas City Royals players
Major League Baseball third basemen
Memphis Redbirds players
Modesto A's players
New York Mets players
Norfolk Tides players
Oakland Athletics players
Omaha Royals players
Pan American Games medalists in baseball
Pan American Games silver medalists for the United States
Southern Oregon A's players
St. Louis Cardinals players
Tacoma Tigers players
United States national baseball team players
Medalists at the 1999 Pan American Games